Zhang Na (born 19 April 1980 in Tianjin) is a retired female Chinese volleyball player. She was part of the gold medal winning teams at the 2003 World Cup and 2004 Olympic Games.

Awards

Individuals
 2003 Asian Women's Volleyball Championship "Best Receiver"
 2004 Olympic Games "Best Receiver"
 2008 Olympic Games "Best Digger"
 2004 FIVB World Grand Prix "Best Libero"
 2005 FIVB World Grand Prix "Best Libero"
 2008 Asian Cup Championship "Best Receiver"

References
Profile

Chinese women's volleyball players
Olympic bronze medalists for China
Olympic gold medalists for China
Olympic volleyball players of China
Volleyball players from Tianjin
Volleyball players at the 2004 Summer Olympics
Volleyball players at the 2008 Summer Olympics
1980 births
Living people
Olympic medalists in volleyball
Medalists at the 2008 Summer Olympics
Medalists at the 2004 Summer Olympics
Asian Games medalists in volleyball
Volleyball players at the 2006 Asian Games
Asian Games gold medalists for China

Medalists at the 2006 Asian Games
Liberos
21st-century Chinese women